Man of the Moment is a play by the British playwright Alan Ayckbourn. It was premiered at the Stephen Joseph Theatre in Scarborough on 10 August 1988 and transferred to the Globe Theatre in the West End on 14 February 1990.

Original West End cast
Jill Rillington, TV presenter - Samantha Bond
Douglas Beechey, former hero who prevented a bank robbery by Parks and whose future wife was shot in the face by Parks during the robbery - Michael Gambon
Vic Parks, professional bank-robber and TV personality - Peter Bowles
Trudy Parks, Vic's second wife - Diane Bull
Kenny Collins, Parks's manager -David Cunningham
David - Paul Stewart
Sharon, Parks's children's nanny - Shirley-Anne Selby
Ruy, Parks's gardener - Daniel Collings
Ashley Barnes - Terence Booth
Marta - Doreen Andrew

Radio adaptation
As part of celebrations for Ayckbourn's 70th birthday, a radio adaptation directed by Martin Jarvis was broadcast on BBC Radio 4  at 2.30pm on 11 April 2009, with the following cast:
Jill Rillington - Lisa Dillon
Trudy Parks - Janie Dee
Douglas Beechey - Alex Jennings
Vic Parks - Tim Pigott-Smith
Kenny Collins - Damian O'Hare
Sharon - Ella Smith
Ruy - Alan Shearman
Floor Manager - Michael Simkins
David - John Baddeley
Film crew - Kenneth Danziger, Matthew Wolf
Children - Matilda Wickham and Alfie Wickham

External links
Ayckbourn homepage
Radio adaptation

1988 plays
Plays by Alan Ayckbourn